This is a list of Canadian films which were released in 1998:

See also
 1998 in Canada
 1998 in Canadian television

References

External links
Feature Films Released In 1998 With Country of Origin Canada at IMDb

1998
1998 in Canadian cinema
Canada